Isaac Asimov (1920–1992) was a writer.

Asimov may also refer to:

Places
Asimov (crater), an impact crater on Mars, named after Isaac Asimov
5020 Asimov, an asteroid named after Isaac Asimov

Other
Asimov (surname)
Asimov's Science Fiction, an American science fiction magazine named after Isaac Asimov
Asimov's SF Adventure Magazine, a short-lived American science fiction magazine named after Isaac Asimov
Isaac Asimov Awards, four separate awards established in honor of Isaac Asimov

See also
ASIMO
Azimov, Russian last name